Danijel Marčeta (born 4 January 1989) is a Slovenian footballer who plays for Sava Kranj.

Club career
Marčeta started his career with his hometown team Triglav Kranj at the age of 18 in 2007. In his first season with Triglav in 2. SNL he played four games. In the all three seasons at the club, he made 37 appearances and scored 5 goals for Triglav.

On 6 February 2009, it was announced that Marčeta had signed for Partizan on a four-year contract. He was given the number 16 shirt for Partizan. He made his debut for Partizan against Javor Ivanjica on 18 April 2009 in the Serbian SuperLiga.

On 22 July 2009, Marčeta joined Scottish Premier League side Falkirk on an initial one-year loan. He made his debut for Falkirk on 15 August 2009 against Rangers coming on as a substitute for Tom Scobbie in the 46th minute.

In summer 2012, after playing two seasons back home with FC Koper in the Slovenian First League, he moved abroad again, this time by joining S.S. Virtus Lanciano 1924 a newly promoted side of the Italian Serie B.

International career
Marčeta made his first appearance for the Slovenia U21 on 11 February 2009, in a friendly match against Romania U21.

Career statistics

References

External links
 Danijel Marčeta at PrvaLiga 

1989 births
Living people
Sportspeople from Kranj
Slovenian footballers
Slovenia under-21 international footballers
Association football midfielders
FK Partizan players
Falkirk F.C. players
FC Koper players
NK Triglav Kranj players
S.S. Virtus Lanciano 1924 players
Serbian SuperLiga players
Scottish Premier League players
Serie B players
Slovenian PrvaLiga players
Slovenian expatriate footballers
Expatriate footballers in Serbia
Expatriate footballers in Scotland
Expatriate footballers in Italy
Slovenia youth international footballers
Slovenian expatriate sportspeople in Italy
Slovenian expatriate sportspeople in the United Kingdom
Slovenian expatriate sportspeople in Serbia